Halichondrin B is a  polyether macrolide originally isolated from the marine sponge Halichondria okadai by Hirata and Uemura in 1986. In the same report, these authors also reported the exquisite anticancer activity of halichondrin B against murine cancer cells both in culture and in in vivo studies. Halichondrin B was highly prioritized for development as a novel anticancer therapeutic by the United States National Cancer Institute and, in 1991, was the original test case for identification of mechanism of action (in this case, tubulin-targeted mitotic inhibitor) by NCI's then-brand-new "60-cell line screen"  The complete chemical synthesis of halichondrin B was achieved by Yoshito Kishi and colleagues at Harvard University in 1992,  an achievement that ultimately enabled the discovery and development of the structurally simplified and pharmaceutically optimized analog eribulin (E7389, ER-086526, NSC-707389). Eribulin was approved by the U.S. Food and Drug Administration on November 15, 2010, to treat patients with metastatic breast cancer who have received at least two prior chemotherapy regimens for late-stage disease, including both anthracycline- and taxane-based chemotherapies. Eribulin is marketed by Eisai Co. under the tradename Halaven.

Biosynthesis
While a producer organism for Halichondrin B has never been isolated in pure culture, the structural features of Halichondrin B, such as the 'odd-even' rule of methylation, and the abundance of oxygen heterocycles, suggest it is a product of dinoflagellate polyether metabolism. In support of this conjecture, the known dinoflagellate toxin okadaic acid was isolated from the same species of sponge.

References

Macrolides
Polyether toxins